American Made may refer to:

Music
 American Made (The Oak Ridge Boys album), 1983
"American Made" (song), the title track from the album
 American Made (Wakefield album), 2003
 American Made, album by BoDeans, 2012
"American Made", a 1997 song by Jack Off Jill from Sexless Demons and Scars
American Made (BPMD covers album), a 2020 album by BPMD with Mike Portnoy

Other uses
 American Made (book), a 2021 non-fiction book by Farah Stockman
 American Made (film), a 2017 film starring Tom Cruise
 Made in USA, a country of origin mark

See also
 Made in USA (disambiguation)
 Made in America (disambiguation)
 American Maid